Andrea Cangini (born 5 March 1969) is an Italian politician from Action who was elected to the Senate of the Republic in 2018.

References 

Living people
1969 births
21st-century Italian politicians
Senators of Legislature XVIII of Italy
Politicians from Rome
Forza Italia (2013) senators
20th-century Italian people